Dendroblatta is a genus of cockroaches in subfamily Pseudophyllodromiinae. It was described by James A. G. Rehn in 1916.

References

Cockroach genera